MaxIm DL is a software package created by Cyanogen Imaging for the intended purpose of astronomical imaging. It contains tools to process and analyze data from imaging array detectors such as CCDs. It is available officially only for Windows 7 and above; however, Windows installations in other operating systems can reproduce correct operation for both imaging and processing but is not officially supported.

References

Science software
Astronomy software